Barrett Swanson is an American short story writer and essayist. He is the author of Lost in Summerland, an essay collection containing several essays previously published in magazines including The New Yorker, The New York Times Magazine, and The Paris Review. His work often addresses issues of being a Millennial in America with themes like mental illness and the cultural aftermath of the 2016 American presidential election.

Early life and education 
Barrett Swanson was born in 1985 and grew up in Brookfield, Wisconsin, attending a Catholic high school in Waukesha, Wisconsin. He graduated from Loyola University in Chicago with bachelor's degrees in political science and English and received his M.F.A in creative writing from University of Wisconsin-Madison.

Career 
Swanson is a contributing editor at Harper's Magazine and assistant professor at the University of Wisconsin-Whitewater, where he teaches courses in creative writing.

Lost In Summerland 
Lost in Summerland is an essay collection “[chronicling] Swanson’s search for enlightenment amid the ruins of old paradigms,” using a “blend [of] memoir, immersion reporting, and cultural criticism”. Swanson explores topics like the fragility of masculinity, mental illness, and America following the wake of 9/11 and the Iraq War. The title essay, “Lost in Summerland,” explores the spiritual aftermath of his brother's recovery from serious brain injury, taking the author and his brother to New England and a convention for mystics.

Awards 
Barrett Swanson was the winner of the 2015 Pushcart Prize for his short story, “Annie Radcliffe, You Are Loved”. He was also named the 2016-2017 Halls Emerging Artist Fellow at the Wisconsin Institute for Creative Writing. His work has been featured as notable in The Best American Short Stories (2019) and The Best American Essays (2014, 2015, 2017, 2019, 2020).

References

External links 

 https://www.barrettswanson.com/about

Living people
Year of birth missing (living people)